Daniel Ellis Moerman (born 1941) is an American medical anthropologist and ethnobotanist, and an emeritus professor of anthropology at the University of Michigan-Dearborn. He is known for his work relating to Native American ethnobotany and the placebo effect.

Education and career
Moerman was born in Paterson, New Jersey. He received his AB, MA and PhD degrees in anthropology from the University of Michigan in 1963, 1965, and 1974, respectively. He became a professor of anthropology at the University of Michigan-Dearborn in 1984, and was appointed the William E. Stirton Professor of Anthropology at the university in 1994.

Research
Moerman has spent over 25 years developing a catalogue of over 4,000 plants used by Native Americans for medicinal purposes. He has also published studies on the placebo effect, one of which found that more people with stomach ulcers were healed when taking four placebos per day than when taking two.

Awards and honors
In 1991, Moerman became the first faculty member at the University of Michigan's Dearborn campus to receive the University's Distinguished Faculty Governance Award.

References

Medical anthropologists
American anthropologists
Living people
1941 births
People from Paterson, New Jersey
University of Michigan College of Literature, Science, and the Arts alumni
Ethnobotanists
Placebo researchers
University of Michigan faculty